The 2010–11 season of BAI Basket (33rd edition) ran from November 26, 2010, to May 28, 2011, with 12 teams playing the regular season in a double round robin system (regular season). The six best teams played a double round robin tournament for the title in serie A and the last six did the same for the consolation group, serie B.

BAI Basket participants (2010–11 season)

Regular season (November 25, 2010 - March 31, 2011

The home team is listed on the left-hand column.The rightmost column and the bottom row list the teams' home and away records respectively.

Regular season standings

Group stage (April 1–16, 2011)

Serie A

Serie B

The home team is listed on the left-hand column.The rightmost column and the bottom row list the teams' home and away records respectively.

Serie A

Serie B

Serie C - 9th-12t (April 29 - May 28, 2011)

Serie B - 5th-8th (April 29 - May 28, 2011)

Serie A - final four (April 29 - May 28, 2011)

Interclube vs. 1º de Agosto

R. do Libolo vs. Petro Atlético

R. do Libolo vs. 1º de Agosto

Petro Atlético vs. Interclube

Interclube vs. R. do Libolo

1º de Agosto vs. Petro Atlético

Final standings

Awards
2011 BAI Basket MVP
  Olímpio Cipriano (Recreativo do Libolo) 280pts

2011 BAI Basket Top Scorer
  C.Morais (Petro Atlético) 209

2011 BAI Basket Top Rebounder
  Miguel Kiala (Petro Atlético) 75/48

2011 BAI Basket Top Assists
  Olímpio Cipriano (Recreativo do Libolo) 44

See also
 2011 Angola Basketball Cup
 2011 Angola Basketball Super Cup
 2011 Victorino Cunha Cup

References

External links
Official website 
Eurobasket.com league page

Angolan Basketball League seasons
League
Angola